Augusta Wallace may refer to:

Augusta Wallace (actress) (fl. 1940s), American actress
Augusta Wallace (judge) (1929–2008), New Zealand jurist